Lucas Makowsky (born May 30, 1987 in Regina, Saskatchewan) is a Canadian speed skater. He started speed skating at six and went on to rank 1st in Canada in the 5000 m and 10000 m for the 2008–09 season. In addition to skating he also speaks three languages: English, French and Ukrainian.

He competed for Canada at the 2010 Winter Olympics in the 1500 m, 5000 m, and team pursuit. On February 27, he won a gold medal in the team pursuit along with Denny Morrison and Mathieu Giroux.

References

External links
Canada Olympic Team profile page for Lucas Makowsky

1987 births
Living people
Canadian male speed skaters
Speed skaters at the 2010 Winter Olympics
Speed skaters at the 2014 Winter Olympics
Olympic speed skaters of Canada
Olympic medalists in speed skating
Medalists at the 2010 Winter Olympics
Olympic gold medalists for Canada
Canadian people of Ukrainian descent
Sportspeople from Regina, Saskatchewan
World Single Distances Speed Skating Championships medalists
21st-century Canadian people